Polarization gradient cooling (PG cooling) is a technique in laser cooling of atoms. It was proposed to explain the experimental observation of cooling below the doppler limit. Shortly after the theory was introduced experiments were performed that verified the theoretical predictions. While Doppler cooling allows atoms to be cooled to hundreds of microkelvin, PG cooling allows atoms to be cooled to a few microkelvin or less.

The superposition of two counterpropagating beams of light with orthogonal polarizations creates a gradient where the polarization varies in space. The gradient depends on which type of polarization is used. Orthogonal linear polarizations (the lin⊥lin configuration) results in the polarization varying between linear and circular polarization in the range of half a wavelength. However, if orthogonal circular polarizations (the σ+σ− configuration) are used, the result is a linear polarization that rotates along the axis of propagation. Both configurations can be used for cooling and yield similar results, however, the physical mechanisms involved are very different. For the lin⊥lin case, the polarization gradient causes periodic light shifts in Zeeman sublevels of the atomic ground state that allows for a Sisyphus effect to occur. In the σ+-σ− configuration, the rotating polarization creates a motion-induced population imbalance in the Zeeman sublevels of the atomic ground state resulting in an imbalance in the radiation pressure that opposes the motion of the atom. Both configurations achieve sub-Doppler cooling and instead reach the recoil limit. While the limit of PG cooling is lower than that of Doppler cooling, the capture range of PG cooling is lower and thus an atomic gas must be pre-cooled before PG cooling.

Observation of Cooling Below the Doppler Limit 

When laser cooling of atoms was first proposed in 1975, the only cooling mechanism considered was Doppler cooling. As such the limit on the temperature was predicted to be the Doppler limit:

Here kb is the Boltzmann constant, T is the temperature of the atoms, and Γ is the inverse of the excited state's radiative lifetime.
Early experiments seemed to be in agreement with this limit. However, in 1988 experiments began to report temperatures below the Doppler limit. These observations would take the theory of PG cooling to explain.

Theory 

There are two different configurations that form polarization gradients: lin⊥lin and σ+σ−. Both configurations provide cooling, however, the type of polarization gradient and the physical mechanism for cooling are different between the two.

The lin⊥lin Configuration 

In the lin⊥lin configuration cooling is achieved via a Sisyphus effect.

Introducing a new pair of coordinates  and  the field can be written as:

The polarization of the total field changes with z. For example: we see that at  the field is linearly polarized along , at  the field has left circular polarization, at  the field is linearly polarized along , at  the field has right circular polarization, and at  the field is again linearly polarized along .

The variation of the polarization along z results in a variation in the light shifts of the atomic Zeeman sublevels with z. The Clebsch-Gordan coefficient connecting the  state to the  state is 3 times larger than connecting the  state to the  state. Thus for  polarization the light shift is three times larger for the  state than for the  state. The situation is reversed for  polarization, with the light shift being three times larger for the  state than the  state. When the polarization is linear, there is no difference in the light shifts between the two states. Thus the energies of the states will oscillate in z with period .

As an atom moves along z, it will be optically pumped to the state with the largest negative light shift. However, the optical pumping process takes some finite time . For field wavenumber k and atomic velocity v such that , the atom will travel mostly uphill as it moves along z before being pumped back down to the lowest state. In this velocity range, the atom travels more uphill than downhill and gradually loses kinetic energy, lowering its temperature. This is called the Sisyphus effect after the mythological Greek character. Note that this initial condition for velocity requires the atom to be cooled already, for example through Doppler cooling.

The σ+σ− Configuration 

As a result, there is no Sisyphus effect. The rotating polarization instead leads to motion-induced population imbalances in the Zeeman levels that cause imbalances in radiation pressure leading to a damping of the atomic motion.

The superposition of these two waves is:

Consider an atomic moving along z with some velocity v. In the rotating frame, the polarization is fixed, however, there is an inertial field due to the frame rotating. This inertial term appears in the Hamiltonian as follows.

Here we see the inertial term looks like a magnetic field along  with an amplitude such that the Larmor precession frequency is equal to rotation frequency in the lab frame. For small v, this term in Hamiltonian can be treated using perturbation theory.

The rotating term in the Hamiltonian causes perturbations in the atomic eigenstates such that the Zeeman sublevels become contaminated by each other. The populations are equal for the  states. However, when we change basis we see that populations are not balanced in the z-basis and there is a non-zero value of  proportional to the atom's velocity:

Where  is the light shift for the  state. There is a motion induced population imbalance in the Zeeman sublevels in the z basis. For red detuned light,  is negative, and thus there will be a higher population in the  state when the atom is moving to the right (positive velocity) and a higher population in the  state when the atom is moving to the left (negative velocity). From the Clebsch-Gordan coefficients, we see that the  state has a six times greater probability of absorbing a  photon moving to the left than a  photon moving to the right. The opposite is true for the  state. When the atom moves to the right it is more likely to absorb a photon moving to the left and likewise when the atom moves to the left it is more likely to absorb a photon moving to the right. Thus there is an unbalanced radiation pressure when the atom moves which dampens the motion of the atom, lowering its velocity and therefore its temperature.

Note the similarity to Doppler cooling in the unbalanced radiation pressures due to the atomic motion. The unbalanced pressure in PG cooling is not due to a Doppler shift but an induced population imbalance. At low intensity  and thus PG cooling works at lower atomic velocities (temperatures) than Doppler Cooling.

Limits and Scaling 

Both methods of PG cooling surpass the Doppler limit and instead are limited by the one-photon recoil limit:

Where M is the atomic mass.

For a given detuning  and Rabi frequency , dependent on the light intensity, both configurations display a similar scaling at low intensity and large detuning:

Where  is a dimensionless constant dependent on the configuration and atomic species. See ref  for a full derivation of these results.

Experiment 

PG cooling is typically performed using a 3D optical setup with three pairs of perpendicular laser beams with an atomic ensemble in the center. Each beam is prepared with an orthogonal polarization to its counterpropagating beam. The laser frequency detuned from a selected transition between the ground and excited states of the atom. Since the cooling processes rely on multiple transitions between care must be taken such that the atomic does not fall out of these two states. This is done by using a second, "repumping", laser to pump any atoms that fall out back into the ground state of the transition.

The atoms must be cooled before the PG cooling, this can be done using the same setup via Doppler cooling. If the atoms are precooled with Doppler cooling, the laser intensity must be lowered and the detuning increased for PG cooling to be achieved.

The atomic temperature can be measured using the time of flight (ToF) technique. In this technique, the laser beams are suddenly turned off and the atomic ensemble is allowed to expand. After a set time delay t, a probe beam is turned on to image the ensemble and obtain the spatial extent of the ensemble at time t. By imaging the ensemble at several time delays, the rate of expansion is found. By measuring the rate of expansion of the ensemble the velocity distribution is measured and from this, the temperature is inferred.

These predictions were confirmed experimentally in 1990 when W.D. Phillips et al. observed such scaling in their cesium atoms as well as a temperature of 2.5K, 12 times the recoil temperature of 0.198K for the D2 line of cesium used in the experiment.

References

Quantum optics
Atomic, molecular, and optical physics